Denis Lyons (1 August 1935 – 7 July 2014) was an Irish Fianna Fáil politician.

Lyons was elected to Cork County Council in 1972. He was elected to Dáil Éireann on his first attempt, at the 1981 general election, when he was one of two Fianna Fáil candidates returned to the 22nd Dáil as TDs for the Cork North-Central constituency. He was re-elected at the next four general elections, until his defeat at the 1992 general election.

He achieved ministerial office in 1987, in the 25th Dáil, when Fianna Fáil returned to power under Taoiseach Charles Haughey and formed the 29th Government of Ireland. From 12 March 1987 to 31 March 1987, Lyons served briefly as Minister of State at the Department of the Marine (under Minister Brendan Daly), before being appointed as Minister of State for Tourism and Transport under Minister John Wilson.

At the 1989 general election Fianna Fáil hoped to increase its representation in the 26th Dáil but instead lost seats, and entered a coalition government with the Progressive Democrats. Lyons returned to his previous job as Minister of State, this time in the renamed Department of Tourism Transport and Communications, under Minister Séamus Brennan. He left ministerial office in a reshuffle on 11 February 1992.

At the 1992 general election, Fianna Fáil won only one seat in the five-seater Cork North-Central constituency, and Fine Gael's Liam Burke replaced Lyons in the 27th Dáil. Lyons then stood unsuccessfully at the 1993 Seanad Éireann election by the Industrial and Commercial Panel. He contested the 1997 Seanad election by the Cultural and Educational Panel but again lost, and then retired from politics.

He died on 7 July 2014.

References

1935 births
2014 deaths
Fianna Fáil TDs
Members of the 22nd Dáil
Members of the 23rd Dáil
Members of the 24th Dáil
Members of the 25th Dáil
Members of the 26th Dáil
Ministers of State of the 26th Dáil
Ministers of State of the 25th Dáil
Politicians from County Cork
Local councillors in County Cork